Lepechinellidae is a family of crustaceans belonging to the order Amphipoda, and was first described in 1926 by Adolf Schellenberg.

Genera:
 Lepechinella Stebbing, 1908
 Lepechinelloides Thurston, 1980
 Lepechinellopsis Ledoyer, 1982
 Lepesubchela Johansen & Vader, 2015
 Paralepechinella Pirlot, 1933

References

Amphipoda